Sint-Ulriks-Kapelle is a village and deelgemeente of Dilbeek.

History 
Historically, Sint-Ulriks-Kapelle was a part of the Land of Asse.

Together with Dilbeek, Groot-Bijgaarden, Itterbeek, Schepdaal and Sint-Martens-Bodegem, it has formed the municipality of Dilbeek since 1 January 1977.

Geography

Attractions
 Sint-Ulrik Church
 The neo-classical : built in 1773 by the architect Laurent-Benoît Dewez, now used as a cultural centre.
 Castle Nieuwermolen
 Brewery Girardin: an authentic lambic brewery

Education
 Klein klein kleutertje (nursery school)
 De Kriebel (primary school)

Bagaya-Kapelle
Since 1989, Sint-Ulriks-Kapelle is twinned with Bagaya, a village in the Casamance, in the south of Senegal. The goal is to bring the two communities closer together and to support several local development projects.

External links
 Municipality of Dilbeek
 Bagaya-Kapelle (Dutch)

Dilbeek
Populated places in Flemish Brabant